Ian F. Akyildiz (born Ilhan Fuat Akyildiz on April 11, 1954, in Istanbul, Turkey) is a German academic. He received his BS, MS, and PhD degrees in Electrical and Computer Engineering from the University of Erlangen-Nürnberg, Germany, in 1978, 1981 and 1984, respectively. Currently, he is the President and CTO of the Truva Inc. since March 1989. He retired from the School of Electrical and Computer Engineering (ECE) at Georgia Tech in 2021 after almost 35 years service as Ken Byers Chair Professor in Telecommunications and Chair of the Telecom group.

He also serves on the advisory board of the Technology Innovation Institute (TII) in Abu Dhabi, United Arab Emirates since June 1, 2020. He is also an adjunct professor with the University of Helsinki since 2021, University of Iceland since 2020, Norwegian University of Science and Technology (NTNU) since 2019. Dr. Akyildiz is also a Visiting Distinguished Professor with the Shiv Nadar University, SSN College of Engineering, Chennai, India since October 2019.

Dr. Akyildiz was the Megagrant Research Leader and Advisor to the Director of the Institute for Information Transmission Problems at the Russian Academy of Sciences, in Moscow, Russia, (2018-2020). He was an adjunct professor with the University of Cyprus (2017–2020). He is the Ken Byers Chair Professor Emeritus in Telecommunications, Past Chair of the Telecom group at the ECE and the Director of the Broadband Wireless Networking Laboratory between (1985–2020) at the Georgia Institute of Technology. Dr. Akyildiz had many international affiliations during his career. He established many research centers in Spain, South Africa, Finland, Saudi Arabia, Germany, Russia, India, Cyprus, etc.

He is giving keynote speeches at many international conferences, delivered distinguished seminars and teaches tutorials/classes worldwide.

He advised 48 PhD students, and 13 PostDocs, 52 visiting researchers at Georgia Institute of Technology, and 15 Master students at Universitat Politècnica de Catalunya, Barcelona, Spain.

His current research interests are in 6G/7G, Wireless Systems, TeraHertz Communication, Reconfigurable Intelligent Surfaces, Nanonetworks, Internet of Space Things/CUBESATs, Internet of BioNanoThings, Molecular Communication and Underwater Communication. According to Google Scholar as of November 2022, his h-index is 134 and the total number of citations to his papers is 138+K.

Research contributions
In the following the most notable contributions are highlighted.

1980s

Queueing Network Models
Dr. Akyildiz started his research work on queueing networks models in the early 1980s. His PhD thesis (1984) was entitled “Multiprocessor Systems with Process Communication” where he developed queuing network models to analyze the performance of the multiprocessor systems which were important subject in the early 1980s. In particular, he developed queueing network models for process communication where the buffers were finite and blocking/losses of messages could occur.

His paper  was the first which was an original work introducing the duality of the state spaces of queueing networks with blocking/finite buffers versus queueing networks without blocking kind of mapping of state space to each other, and accordingly obtaining exact product form solution for two nodes.

Based on this novel duality concept, Dr. Akyildiz showed in  an approximate duality (mapping) of state spaces between queuing networks with and without blocking having arbitrary number of nodes. He then derived the approximate throughput formula and also derived approximate product form solutions in.

He published many other papers on queuing network models. These contributions lead him to obtain the IEEE Fellow rank in 1996.

1990s

ATM and Wireless ATM Networks
In 1997 Ian Akyildiz with his colleagues at the YURIE  systems designed and implemented the first adaptive forward-error-correction solution on the link layer of their wireless ATM switch providing high reliability in wireless ATM networks with very low bit data rates used in battlefield scenarios. A patent for this solution was obtained in 2006 .

A technical paper describing the link layer design on this low bit rate wireless ATM switch was published.

The founder of the Yurie Systems, Jeong H. Kim, received the entrepreneur of the year award in 1997 and Yurie Systems was acquired by Lucent for 1 Billion US Dollars in 1998.

Mobility Management in 2G and 3G Cellular Systems
Ian Akyildiz significantly contributed to mobility and resource management of 2G and 3G cellular systems in the 90s. He proposed many handoff management, location registration, and paging schemes for the design of 3G and 4G wireless systems, and all of his papers have been published in top notch journals and conferences between 1998 and 2000.

His paper titled “Mobility Management in Next-Generation Wireless Systems” was invited to be included in Proceedings of IEEE, and is the most cited paper on mobility management in the literature, and became “the” main reading material for the first course on mobile networks in many universities.

His contributions to mobility and resource management gained him the ACM Fellow rank in 1997.

2000s

4G Wireless Systems and Mobility/Resource Management
Ian Akyildiz started to use the notion “4G” wireless networks in 1999-2000 through his papers and keynote speeches. He clearly pointed out the requirements for heterogeneous 4G wireless systems, such as anywhere/anytime wireless connectivity with hundreds of Mbps bandwidth per mobile user for both data and multimedia services. Consequently, the first adaptive protocol suite framework for Next Generation Wireless Internet was supported by NSF (National Science Foundation) (2000-2005) NSF #:ANI-0117840.

His early insights on the need to enable a single mobile terminal to seamlessly communicate over heterogeneous wireless access systems such as wireless LANs, 3G cellular networks, and satellite networks are seminal contributions to 4G systems.These ideas were the forerunner of the dynamic spectrum access and cognitive radio networks.

The culmination of his research work on this topic gained him the 2003 ACM SIGMOBILE Outstanding Contribution Award for his "pioneering contributions in the area of mobility and resource management for wireless communication networks", in September 2003.

SATELLITE and HALO (High Altitude Low Orbit) COMMUNICATIONS
Akyildiz, in collaboration and with support of NASA, developed several routing algorithms and a novel transport control protocol called TCP Peach  to realize practical satellite networks.

He significantly contributed towards the development and realization of high altitude long operation (HALO) networks for providing broadband wireless network access which was implemented by Angel Technologies and Raytheon, exploited by invention disclosures and ). HALO was the forerunner of the current UAVs and Drones and Cubesats research. Couple decades later many countries are working on the directions of the HALO project.

This paper  is the first to comprehensively put forward the design principles and system reference model for HALO networks, which is a broadband wireless metropolitan area network with a star topology, whose solitary hub is located in the atmosphere above the service area at an altitude higher than commercial airline traffic.

Wireless Sensor Networks
With the extremely timely publication of the first and most comprehensive roadmap paper on wireless sensor networks, Akyildiz made this new research area known to the entire world. Many researchers, who work on sensor networks, has started by reading his paper. Hence, this publication has received more than 41,000 citations in 20 years. Moreover, this paper received the best tutorial paper award from IEEE Communications society in 2003.

Thanks to his paper, the area has attracted significantly amplified attention and become focus of research and engineering efforts towards realizing wide range of sensor network applications.In 20 years, the research in this area has resulted in billions of dollars of investment from both government and private sector, educated thousands of students, and helped establish hundreds of companies.

Dr. Akyildiz published many pioneering papers on wireless sensor networks. For example, in  the first reliable protocol (Event-to-Sink Reliable Transport -ESRT-) was introduced specifically tailored for the unique requirements and characteristics of wireless sensor networks. ESRT was devised based on the extremely novel and yet practical engineering notion of event-to-sink reliability, which leverages the inherent redundancy and spatio-temporal correlation in sensor networks to maximize the network lifetime. ESRT has also been taught in undergraduate and graduate level wireless networking courses at many universities. This work has been implemented in several simulation tools.

The pioneering contributions to the field of wireless sensor networks was recognized as the IEEE Computer Society W. Wallace McDowell Award 2011.

He is also the recipient of the IEEE Communications Society Ad Hoc and Sensor Networks Technical Committee (AHSN TC) Technical Recognition Award based on his pioneering contributions to wireless sensor networks and wireless mesh networks.

Wireless Sensor Networks in Challenged Environments such as Underwater and Underground
Akyildiz wasone of the first to introduce several advanced and next generation wireless sensor network paradigms and architectures to the research community including sensor and actor networks, multimedia sensor networks, underwater acoustic sensor networks, wireless underground sensor networks, underground magnetic sensor networks, along with the comprehensive list of open research issues and the first novel communication techniques.

Preliminary version of this paper  received the best paper award from IEEE GlobeCom 2009 conference.

Cognitive Radio Networks/Dynamic Spectrum Access Networks
The paper  became the flagpole paper that every researcher reads first as the first initiation into the field of CR networks during the heyday of the CR networks. The paper  had major impact as it is the first work which demonstrated the existence of optimal sensing parameters theoretically and developed the framework to support this optimality in real network environments. This paper identified the interference model for CR, well-motivated from the limitation of communication hardware that RF front-ends cannot differentiate between the transmissions of primary and secondary users. It developed a practical spectrum sensing solution, where an optimal observation time and a transmission time are determined to maximize sensing efficiency while satisfying interference limits.

The paper  is the first research work that identifies the practical issues and derives possible solutions when extending the CR concept to cellular mobile networks. Specifically, this paper defined two mobility types in the CR cellular networks, user mobility and spectrum mobility.

Akyildiz and his PhD students coined the word “CRAHNs” for the first time in, which is used as a standard terminology by the research community in the meantime. Specifically, this paper looked at the network architectures, where multiple nodes are not associated with a single controller (hence, called CR ad hoc networks or CRAHNs). Many practical networks can be built on top of such distributed architectures for consumer, military and disaster scenarios, with unpredictable spectrum availability. CRAHNS must operate in a dynamic environment where locations, spectrum availability, and neighboring forwarding nodes can change over time, and so are completely different from cellular networks.

All these pioneering contributions lead to receive the prestigious IEEE ComSoc TCCN Recognition Award in 2017 by the IEEE ComSoc Technical Committee on Cognitive Networks (TCCN) with citation "for pioneering contributions to spectrum sensing, spectrum sharing algorithms and communication protocols for cognitive radio networks".

2010s and 2020s

Nanonetworks/Internet of NanoThings
From the nano-device perspective, Akyildiz and his student Jornet proposed for the first time and investigated the use of graphene to develop nano-antennas for electromagnetic (EM) communication in nanonetworks in. This paper showed that, by using a narrow graphene nanoribbon (GNR), an antenna just a few hundreds of nanometers long and tens of nanometers wide could radiate EM waves in the Terahertz (THz) band (0.1-10 THz). This framework is used to characterize the propagation characteristics of Surface Plasmon Polariton (SPP) waves in graphene. This work has become a foundation stone for EM nanonetworks and a US Patent was obtained for this technology in 2017.

Akyildiz and Jornet also proposed a plasmonic nano-transceiver that intrinsically operate in the THz band in where the basic idea is based on the integration of III-V High-Electron-Mobility Transistors (HEMT) with graphene in. In 2016, a US Patent is obtained for this technology.

Molecular Communication/Internet of BioNanoThings

Akyildiz and his student Pierobon also developed one of the first realistic molecular communication channel models and capacity analysis for molecular communication in.

TeraHertz Band Communication
Terahertz Band (0.1-10 THz) communication is envisioned as one of the key wireless technologies of the next decade. The THz band will help to overcome the spectrum scarcity problems and capacity limitations of current wireless networks, by providing an unprecedentedly large bandwidth. In addition, THz-band communication will enable a plethora of long-awaited applications ranging from instantaneous massive data transfer among nearby devices in Terabit Wireless Personal and Local Area Networks, to ultra-high-definition content streaming over mobile devices in 6G systems.

The peculiarities of the channel were captured by utilizing radiative transfer theory to account for the absorption from different types of gaseous molecules. In addition, he analytically calculated the channel capacity of the THz band for different medium compositions and power allocation schemes.

Reconfigurable Intelligent Surfaces
Electromagnetic waves undergo multiple uncontrollable alterations as they propagate within a wireless environment. Free space path loss, signal absorption, as well as reflections, refractions, and diffractions caused by physical objects within the environment highly affect the performance of wireless communications. Currently, such effects are intractable to account for and are treated as probabilistic factors. A radically different approach, enabling deterministic, programmable control over the behavior of wireless environments was first introduced in the VISORSURF project.

The key enabler is the so-called HyperSurface tile, a novel class of two-dimensional metamaterials that can interact with impinging electromagnetic waves in a controlled manner. The tiles can effectively re-engineer electromagnetic waves, including steering toward any desired direction, full absorption, polarization manipulation. Multiple tiles coat objects such as walls, furniture, and other objects in indoor and outdoor settings. An external software service calculates and deploys the optimal interaction types per tile to best fit the needs of communicating devices.. A patent was acquired in January 2020.

The Internet of Space Things with CubeSats
A novel cyber-physical system spanning ground, air, and space, called the Internet of Space Things/CubeSats (IoST) is introduced in. IoST expands the functionalities of traditional IoT, by not only providing an always-available satellite backhaul network, but also by contributing real-time satellite-captured information and, more importantly, performing integration of on the ground data and satellite information to enable new applications. The fundamental building block for IoST is a new generation of nano-satellites known as CubeSats, which are augmented with Software Defined Networking (SDN) and Network Function Virtualization (NFV) solutions.

Editing career
He is the Founder and Editor in Chief of the newly established of the ITU (International Telecommunication Union) Journal on Future and Evolving Technologies (ITU-J FET) since August 2020. Dr. Akyildiz is the Editor-in-Chief Emeritus of Computer Networks Journal (Elsevier) (1999-2019), the founding Editor-in-Chief Emeritus of the Ad Hoc Networks Journal (Elsevier) (2003-2019), Physical Communication (PHYCOM) Journal (Elsevier) (2008-2017), and Nano Communication Networks (NANOCOMNET) Journal (Elsevier) (2010-2017).

He is a former editor for IEEE/ACM Transactions on Networking (1996-2001), Kluwer Journal of Cluster Computing (1997-2001), ACM-Springer Journal for Multimedia Systems (1995-2002), for IEEE Transactions on Computers (1992-1996) as well as for ACM-Springer Journal of Wireless Networks (WINET) (1995-2005). He served as a guest-editor for several special issues of various journals.

Conferences
He was the technical program chair of the 9th IEEE Computer Communications workshop in 1994.

In 1995, he co-launched the ACM MobiCom (International Conference on Mobile Computing and Networking), which is now the premier conference in the broad field of wireless networking, and he was the Technical Program Chair for MobiCom'96 and MobiCom'02.

He was also Technical Program Chair for IEEE INFOCOM'98 (Computer Networking Conference) and IEEE ICC'2003 (International Conference on Communications).

He is the co-founder of the ACM SenSys (Sensor Systems) Conference and General Co-chair of the ACM SenSys'03, which took place in Los Angeles in November 2003.

He was the General Chair for Third Med Hoc (Mediterranean Conference on Ad Hoc Networks), in Bodrum, Turkey, June 2004, and the General Chair of the IFIP Networking'07 Conference in Atlanta, May 2007.

In order to help and boost the research activities in the Black Sea region countries, in 2013 a group of researchers including him established the IEEE BlackSeaCom Conference (International Black Sea Conference on Communications and Networking). The first BlackSeaCom took place in Batumi, Georgia.

Similarly, to help to connect the Balkan countries to the Western research world, he was a member of the steering committee that launched the BalkanCom conference BalkanCom in Tirana, Albania in 2017.

He was also the Founder of the ACM NanoCom (International Conference on Nanoscale Computing and Communication), which he launched in May 2013 with the goal of accelerating the nanoscale computing, communication and networking research activities.

Textbooks
Dr. Akyildiz is the author of the following books:

 I. F. Akyildiz and X. Wang: Wireless Mesh Networks, John Wiley Publishing Company, February 2009.
 I. F. Akyildiz and M. C. Vuran: Wireless Sensor Networks, John Wiley Publishing Company, August 2010.
 Z. Sun and I. F. Akyildiz, "Key Communication Techniques for Underground Sensor Networks," Foundations and Trends in Networking, Now Publishers Inc., April 2012.
 J. M. Jornet and I. F. Akyildiz, "Fundamentals of Electromagnetic Nanonetworks in the Terahertz Band," Foundations and Trends in Networking, Now Publishers Inc., November 2013
 M. Pierobon and I. F. Akyildiz, "Fundamentals of Diffusion-Based Molecular Communication in Nanonetworks," Foundations and Trends in Networking, Now Publishers Inc, April 2014.

Patents
 I. F. Akyildiz and A. Kak, "A Low-Overhead Online Routing Scheme for Ultra-Dense Software-Defined CubeSat Networks", US Patent Application No. 63/091712 on October 2, 2020.
 I. F. Akyildiz and A. Kak, "Large-Scale Constellation Design Framework", US Patent Application No. 63/091666 on August 15, 2020.
 I. F. Akyildiz, A. Kak, and S. Nie, "Network Employing Cube Satellites", WO Patent Application No. WO2020124076A1 on June 1, 2020.
 A. Pitsillides, Christos Liaskos, A. Tsioliaridou, S. Ioannides, and I. F. Akyildiz, "Wireless communication paradigm: realizing programmable wireless environments through software-controlled metasurfaces",  on February 7, 2020.
 M. Luo, S.-C. Lin, and I.F. Akyildiz, "Maximize network capacity policy with heavy-tailed traffic",  on March 19, 2019.
 M. Luo, S.-C. Lin, and I.F. Akyildiz, "Software defined network traffic congestion control",  on December 11, 2018.
 I.F. Akyildiz, H.K. Schmidt, S.-C. Lin, and A.A. Al-Shehri, "Environment-aware cross-layer communication protocol in underground oil reservoirs", U.S. Patent No. 10,117,042 on October 30, 2018.
 M. Luo, S.-C. Lin, and I.F. Akyildiz, "Multi-controller control traffic balancing in software defined networks",  on October 2, 2018.
 H.K. Schmidt, I.F. Akyildiz, S.-C. Lin, and A.A. Al-Shehri, "Magnetic induction based localization for wireless sensor networks in underground oil reservoirs",  on August 14, 2018.
 I. F. Akyildiz and J. M. Jornet, "Ultra Massive MIMO Communication in the Terahertz Band,"  B2 on November 21, 2017.
 I. F. Akyildiz and J. M. Jornet, "Graphene-based Plasmonic Nano-antenna for Terahertz Band Communication,"  on May 9, 2017.
 I.F. Akyildiz, and J.M. Jornet, "Graphene-based Plasmonic Nano-Transceiver employing HEMT for Terahertz Band Communication",  on July 19, 2016.
 I. F. Akyildiz, D. Gutierrez-Estevez, and E. Chavarria-Reyes, "Femto-Relay Systems and Methods of Managing Same,"  B2 on March 10, 2015.
 I. F. Akyildiz, "Systems and Methods for Asynchronous Transfer Mode and Internet Protocol," U.S. Patent No.  in June 2006.

Awards
 Best Paper Award for "Automatic Network Slicing for Resource Allocation in Underwater Acoustic Communication Systems" at the Fourth International Balkan Conference on Communications and Networking (BalkanCom 2021) in September 2021.
 "Pioneer Award in Underwater Communication", for "his significant contributions to underwater communication networks" at the 13th ACM International Conference on Underwater Networks & Systems (WUWNet'18) in Shenzhen, China on December 4, 2018.
 IEEE ComSoc Technical Committee on Cognitive Networks (TCCN) Recognition Award for "pioneering contributions to spectrum sensing, spectrum sharing algorithms and communication protocols for cognitive radio networks" in October 2017.
 ACM MSWIM Reginald A. Fassenden Award with the citation: "For pioneering contributions for modeling and analysis of cellular and multihop wireless communication systems" in September 2014.
Humboldt Research Prize from Alexander von Humboldt Foundation, Germany, in November 2013.
 FiDiPro (Finland Distinguished Professor) Professorship at Tampere University of Technology, Department of Communications Engineering, Finland, supported by the Academy of Science in Finland, in January 2013 for the next 4 years.
 2011 TUBITAK (Turkish National Science Foundation) Exclusive Award for "Outstanding contributions to the advancement of scholarship/research at international level", December 2011.
 2011 IEEE Computer Society W. Wallace McDowell Award for "Pioneering contributions to wireless sensor network architectures and communication protocols", in May 2011.
 2010 IEEE Communications Society Ad Hoc and Sensor Networks Technical Committee (AHSN TC) Technical Recognition Award with the citation: "For pioneering contributions to wireless sensor networks and wireless mesh networks", December 2010.
 Best Paper Award for "Deployment Algorithms for Wireless Underground Sensor Networks using Magnetic Induction" in the IEEE Global Communications Conference (Globecom), December 2010.
 Best Paper Award for "Interferer Classification, Channel Selection and Transmission Adaptation for Wireless Sensor Networks" in the Ad Hoc and Sensor Networks (AHSN) symposium at IEEE International Conference on Communications (ICC), June 2009.
 2009 ECE Distinguished Mentor Award for mentoring junior faculty (in connection with teaching and research activities) by the Georgia Tech School of Electrical and Computer Engineering in April.
 2009 Georgia Tech Outstanding Doctoral Thesis Advisor Award for his 20+ years service and dedication to Georgia Tech and producing outstanding PhD students in April 2009.
 2005 Distinguished Faculty Achievement Award from School of ECE, Georgia Tech, April 2005.
 2004 Georgia Tech Faculty Research Author Award for his "Outstanding record of publications of papers between 1999-2003", April 2004.
 2003 ACM SIGMOBILE Outstanding Contribution Award for his "Pioneering contributions in the area of mobility and resource management for wireless communication networks", September 2003.
 2003 Best Tutorial Paper Award (IEEE Communications Society) for this paper entitled "A Survey on Sensor Networks" published in the IEEE Communications Magazine, August 2002.
 2002 IEEE Harry M. Goode Memorial Award (IEEE Computer Society) with the citation "For significant and pioneering contributions to advanced architectures and protocols for wireless and satellite networking".
 1997 IEEE Leonard G. Abraham Prize award (IEEE Communications Society) for his paper entitled "Multimedia Group Synchronization Protocols for Integrated Services Architectures" published in the IEEE Journal of Selected Areas in Communications (JSAC) in January 1996.
 ACM Outstanding Distinguished Lecturer Award for 1994.
 1997 ACM Fellow with the citation: "For fundamental research contributions in: finite capacity queuing network models; performance evaluation of Time Warp parallel simulations; traffic Control in ATM networks, and mobility management in wireless networks".
 1996 IEEE Fellow with the citation: "For contributions to performance analysis of computer communication networks".
 ACM Distiguinshed Lecturer Award in 1994.
 The Don Federico Santa Maria Medal for his services to the Universidad of Federico Santa Maria in Chile in 1986.

References

External links
Why April 11, 1954 Is Statistically The Most Boring Day Ever Video that mentions Akyildz as the most important person born that day.

Georgia Tech faculty
Electrical engineering academics
Turkish expatriates in Austria
Turkish expatriates in Germany
Academic journal editors
Academic staff of the University of Pretoria
1954 births
Academic staff of King Abdulaziz University
Engineers from Istanbul
Academic staff of the University of the Balearic Islands
Fellow Members of the IEEE
American telecommunications engineers
American information theorists
Turkish electrical engineers
German emigrants to the United States
University of Erlangen-Nuremberg alumni
Fellows of the Association for Computing Machinery
Living people